NEDO may refer to:
National Economic Development Office, in the United Kingdom
New Energy and Industrial Technology Development Organization, in Japan